The Sunday Times Rich List 2009 was published on 26 April 2009.

Since 1989 the UK national Sunday newspaper The Sunday Times (sister paper to The Times) has published an annual magazine supplement to the newspaper called the Sunday Times Rich List. The list is based on an estimate of the minimum wealth of the richest 1,000 people or families in the United Kingdom as of January of that year, and is compiled by Dr Philip Beresford. 

A separate section lists the 250 richest Irish, including both Northern Ireland and the Republic of Ireland.

As in previous years, the List was widely previewed in the UK media and extensively covered on the day of its publication.

The top three places in the List were unchanged from the previous year. The Hinduja brothers, ranked 4th in 2008, and Leonard Blavatnik, ranked 11th in 2008, were removed from the list. Among the most notable changes were the loss of £155 billion from the collective fortunes of Britain's richest 1,000 people, equivalent to more than a third of their estimated wealth, as a consequence of the recession.

Top 25 fortunes

See also
Lists of billionaires

References

External links
 Sunday Times Rich List online edition

Sunday Times Rich List
2009 in the United Kingdom